Weishi County is a county in the central part of Henan province, China. It is under the administration of Kaifeng City.

Administrative divisions
As 2012, this county is divided to 9 towns and 8 townships.
Towns

Townships

Climate

References

 
County-level divisions of Henan
Kaifeng